Juan Coy is a Belizean politician. He was elected to the House of Representatives in 2008 for the Toledo West constituency. Coy was appointed as Minister of State in the Ministry of Human Development. In 2012, he lost re-election to Oscar Requeña.

References

Year of birth missing (living people)
Living people
People from Toledo District
Belizean Maya people
United Democratic Party (Belize) politicians
Government ministers of Belize
Members of the Belize House of Representatives for Toledo West